Samuel Arza Davenport (January 15, 1834 – August 1, 1911) was a Republican member of the U.S. House of Representatives from Pennsylvania.

Samuel A. Davenport was born near Watkins Glen, New York.  He moved to Pennsylvania with his parents, who settled in Erie, Pennsylvania, in 1839.  He attended the Erie Academy.  He studied law, was admitted to the bar in 1854, in 1855 was graduated from the Harvard Law School, and commenced the practice of his profession in Erie.  He was elected district attorney for the county of Erie in 1860.  He was owner and publisher of the Erie Gazette from 1865 to 1890.  He was a delegate to the Republican National Conventions in 1888 and 1892.

Davenport was elected as an at-large Republican to the Fifty-fifth and Fifty-sixth Congresses.  He was not a candidate for renomination in 1900.  He resumed the practice of law in the county, State, and Federal courts.  He was also interested in the Erie Car Works, and in the manufacture of organs and boots and shoes.  He died in Erie in 1911 and buried in Erie Cemetery.

Sources

The Political Graveyard

1834 births
1911 deaths
Pennsylvania lawyers
Politicians from Erie, Pennsylvania
Harvard Law School alumni
Republican Party members of the United States House of Representatives from Pennsylvania
19th-century American politicians
19th-century American lawyers